Josef "Sepp" Herberger (28 March 1897 – 28 April 1977) was a German football player and manager. He is most famous for being the manager of the West German national team that won the 1954 FIFA World Cup final, a match later dubbed The Miracle of Bern, defeating the overwhelming favourites from Hungary. Previously he had also coached the Breslau Eleven, one of the greatest teams in German football history.

Early life and career
Born in Mannheim, Herberger grew up in a poor, Catholic family of farmers, which moved to Mannheim in order to work in the local Saint-Gobain glass factory.  

He later played three times for the German football team between 1921 and 1925 before becoming assistant to Otto Nerz in 1932. Herberger succeeded him as national coach after Germany's uninspired loss to Norway in quarter finals at the 1936 Olympics. After the war, he had a short spell as interim coach with Eintracht Frankfurt, before being recalled as national team coach in 1950. He remained the position until 1964, when he was succeeded by Helmut Schön. He died of pneumonia in Weinheim-Hohensachsen (de), aged 80.

1954 World Cup win, "The Miracle of Bern"
Hungary was the overwhelming favourite to win the 1954 World Cup. Its legendary Golden Team, also known as the Mighty Magyars, had not lost a match in four years. They were the reigning Olympic Champion and had won the Central European International Cup in 1953. Once the World Cup started, Hungary had been dominant, outscoring their opponents 17–3 in their two group games while West Germany had been outscored 9–7. In their match against each other, Hungary had won 8–3. The final was played in heavy rain. Hungary scored an early goal and minutes later doubled their lead. Germany pulled one back within two minutes, and equalized eight minutes after that. Hungary had more chances the rest of the way, but was unable to score. West Germany scored with six minutes left in the match to win 3–2. Among Herberger's moves credited with helping the team in the final are: fielding a below strength and largely out-of-position team in the first match against Hungary, to disguise the team's strengths; giving Fritz Walter defensive help, so he could concentrate his energies on attacking; and instructing his team to attack the Hungarian penalty area from the wings, instead of down the middle.

References in popular culture
Three of Herberger's popular sayings are quoted in the beginning of the 1998 film Run Lola Run.  The first is at the very beginning of the film (Nach dem Spiel ist vor dem Spiel, "After the game is before the game").  Then after a series of intentionally confusing and seemingly innocuous statements and character introductions, a simple minded security guard utters the phrase "Der Ball ist rund und das Spiel dauert 90 Minuten", which is a commonly used amalgamation of two separate famous quotes.

The 2003 film, The Miracle of Bern, following Herberger and his team's path to victory in the 1954 World Cup, also features a number of these quotations including the amalgamation of two of the above, "The ball is round and the game lasts for 90 minutes" (Der Ball ist rund und das Spiel dauert 90 Minuten).

Controversy
Herberger joined the Nazi Party in 1933. His nomination to the Germany's Sports Hall of Fame in 2008 caused some criticism because of his Nazi past.

Coaching record

Honours

As a player
VfR Mannheim
South German Championship: 1925

As a manager
West Germany
FIFA World Cup: 1954

Individual
 Berlin-Britz Manager of the Decade (1950s)
World Soccer 20th Greatest Manager of All Time: 2013

Filmography
 The Big Game (1942)

References

External links
 
 Sepp Herberger at the Germany's Sports Hall of Fame (in German)
 Sepp Herberger at eintracht-archiv.de
 Profile at FIFA website (archived 7 November 2012)

1897 births
1977 deaths
1938 FIFA World Cup managers
1954 FIFA World Cup managers
1958 FIFA World Cup managers
1962 FIFA World Cup managers
Al-Wasl F.C. managers
Association football forwards
Commanders Crosses of the Order of Merit of the Federal Republic of Germany
Eintracht Frankfurt managers
Expatriate football managers in the United Arab Emirates
FIFA World Cup-winning managers
German football managers
German footballers
German Roman Catholics
German sports executives and administrators
Germany international footballers
Germany national football team managers
Deaths from pneumonia in Germany
Nazi Party members
People from the Grand Duchy of Baden
Recipients of the Silver Laurel Leaf
Footballers from Mannheim
SV Babelsberg 03 managers
SV Waldhof Mannheim players
Tennis Borussia Berlin managers
Tennis Borussia Berlin players
VfR Mannheim players
West German football managers
West German footballers
Association football coaches